The Caminca (also: Camenca) is a left tributary of the river Trotuș in Romania. It discharges into the Trotuș in Brusturoasa.

References

Rivers of Romania
Rivers of Bacău County